Ibrahim Kamil Al-Windawi (born 9 September 1988) is an Iraqi footballer who last played as a midfielder for Al-Minaa. He is part of Iraq national football team in the 2014 World Cup qualification. He was former in national team when coach  brazilian  Zico  work in national team Iraq.

Honours

Country 
2012 Arab Nations Cup Bronze medallist

External links

Ibrahim Kamil at playmakerstats.com (English version of ogol.com.br)

1988 births
Living people
Iraqi footballers
Association football midfielders
Al-Quwa Al-Jawiya players
Al-Nasr SC (Dubai) players
Al-Mina'a SC players
Iraq international footballers
UAE Pro League players